The Christchurch Convention Centre Precinct is located in Christchurch Central City, New Zealand. It includes the Te Pae Convention centre. The construction of the precinct was funded by the Crown as part of the Christchurch Central Recovery Plan following the 2011 Christchurch earthquake.

Christchurch Convention Centre (Te Pae) 
Ōtākaro Ltd. opened the Te Pae convention centre on 17 December 2021, following several delays, primarily due to a delay in construction and commissioning caused by Covid-19 restrictions as the original date was supposed to be in 2017. At a price of $450 million NZD, it came in slightly under budget.

Facilities and design 
Te Pae was designed by Woods Bagot & Warren and Mahoney.

The 43,000 exterior tiles reflect the Canterbury region's braided rivers; the river concept is extended throughout the building, influencing the shape of the windows and the carpet design.

The Avon River, Victoria Square, and Cathedral Square are visible from the building, and the route of Gloucester Street was interrupted for a block by the site.

The reception area contains a marble reception desk, timber columns, and an illuminated artwork named Hana, designed by sculptor Loni Hutchinson. It includes a 1400-seat auditorium that can divide into two 700-seat areas. There are numerous conference rooms downstairs and a 2800m2 exhibition hall that can be partitioned or enlarged to 3300m2. The banquet hall has a capacity of 1000 people used for gatherings and seminars. The River Rooms, which overlook the Avon River, can accommodate up to 500 people apiece. They can be joined to accommodate 1,000 guests for major banquets and gala events.

Management 
ASM Global, an Australian company, will manage the building, which will employ 200 people. Fifty people will be employed full-time, while 150 will be employed part-time to provide technical, hospitality, and security services for events.

References

External links 
 Te Pae official website

Buildings and structures in Christchurch
Convention centres in New Zealand
Christchurch Central City